The Independents were a group of independent MPs in the UK House of Commons that came together in July 2019. The group, which was not a registered political party, described itself as a "co-operative of independent politicians" who hoped to "encourage a stronger spirit of cross-party working" and "will work collaboratively in the national interest". As a technical group, The Independents did not have any formal policies, only providing administrative support to its members whom were bound by its six key values of "country first, collaboration, integrity, respect, leadership and openness".

The group had five founding members, four who were elected as Labour MPs and one as a Conservative. When parliament was dissolved for the 2019 general election, three had left to join the Liberal Democrats and two remained.

History
The group was formed on 10 July 2019 by five MPs, four of whom were among six MPs who left Change UK on 4 June. The four had been in Change UK since February 2019, having previously been members of the Labour Party (three of them) or the Conservative Party (one). (The others who left Change UK at that time, Chuka Umunna and Sarah Wollaston, joined the Liberal Democrats.) The fifth member of the new group, John Woodcock, had been suspended from Labour in 2018 over charges of sexual harassment and left the party while under investigation. He has offered to have the charges investigated under the new group's procedures.

Following the formation of the group, member Heidi Allen said that it would not offer a policy platform; instead it would provide administrative functions and support to member MPs. She also stated that there was no intention for the group to become a political party.

Luciana Berger and Angela Smith left the group to join the Liberal Democrats in early September 2019, and Allen followed on 7 October 2019.

In the 2019 general election, Woodcock did not stand for reelection and Shuker ran unsuccessfully as an independent candidate. Former members Berger and Smith ran as Liberal Democrat candidates and were also unsuccessful; Allen did not stand for re-election.

Members
The following MPs were members at the 2019 dissolution:

The following MPs had previously been members:

References

External links
Official website

2019 establishments in the United Kingdom
July 2019 events in the United Kingdom
Independent politicians in the United Kingdom
Labour Party (UK) breakaway groups
Technical parliamentary groups